The Komi ( also , also called Komi-Zyryans or Zyryans, are an indigenous Permian ethnic group whose homeland is in the northeast of European Russia around the basins of the Vychegda, Pechora and Kama rivers. They mostly reside in the Komi Republic, Perm Krai, Murmansk Oblast, Khanty–Mansi Autonomous Okrug, and Yamalo-Nenets Autonomous Okrug in the Russian Federation.

Name
There have been at least three names for the Komis: Permyaks, Zyrians and Komi, the last being the self-designation of the people.

The name Permyaks firstly appeared in the 10th century in Russian sources and came from the ancient name of the land between the Mezen River and Pechora River – Perm or "Great Perm". Several origins of the name have been proposed but the most accepted is from Veps Peräma "back, outer or far-away land" from Veps perä "back, extreme" and ma "land". In Old Norse and Old English, it was known as Bjarmaland and Beormas respectively but those Germanic names might designate some other place than the Russian Perm. Since the 20th century, the name has been applied only to the southern Komi (Komi-Permyaks) in Perm Krai. In Russian permyak also means "an inhabitant of Perm or Perm Krai" independently from ethnicity.

The name for the northern Komis – Zyrians – has a more contradictory origin. It exists since the 14th century and it had many different forms in various Russian sources such as Seryan, Siryan, Syryan, Suryan and  Ziryan, Zyryan, but the latter finally became predominant. Turkin believed that it may come from a small local tribe of the Komis (probably named saran) which first met the Russians, hence the name became default for all the northern Komis. The neighbouring Uralic-speaking peoples call the Komis with similar names: Khanty sərän, sərån, săran, sārån, Mansi sarän, Nenets sānnğr, saran, Udmurt sara-kum.

The name Komi is the endonym for all groups of the people. It was first recorded by ethnographers in the 18th century. It originates from a Finno-Ugric word meaning "man, human": Komi kom, Udmurt kum, Mansi kom, kum, Khanty xum, Selkup qum, Hungarian hím "male". The origin from the name of the Kama River is disproved though some scholars (like Paula Kokkonen) favour this version.

Subgroups and geographic distribution 

Komi people are divided into two main groups, which are the Zyryans (northern Komi) & the Permyaks (southern Komi). They are divided into 8 major subgroupings (9 if counting the nearly-assimilated Komi of the Upper Kama), of which they are divided into several even smaller subgroups. The Komi have been traditionally named after the rivers where they live: 
Komi-Zyryans
Komi-Izhma of the Izhma River (Komi: Изьватас, Iźvatas; Nenets: нысма, nysma)
Komi of the Kola Peninsula
Komi of Nenets Autonomous Okrug
Komi of the Lower Ob and Lyapin Rivers
Komi of the Vashka and Mezen Rivers (Komi: Удораса, Udorasa)
Komi of the Vym River (Komi: Емватас, Emvatas)
Komi of the Lower Ob River
Komi of the Pechora River (Komi: Печораса, Pećorasa)
Komi of the Vychegda River (Komi: Эжватас, Ežvatas)
Komi of the Sysola River (Komi: Сыктывсаяс, Syktyvsayas)
Komi of the Letka and Luza Rivers (Komi: Лузса, Lusza)
Komi-Permyaks 
Komi of the Yazva River 
Komi of the Upper Kama River (nearly fully assimilated into Russians)
The majority of Komi (who numbered 256,000 as of the beginning of the 2000s) live in the Komi Republic as a separate national-administrative entity of the Russian Federation. Although the majority of the Komi population live in the Komi Republic, they make up only 30% (256,000) of the total population there as a noticeable minority population. About 60% (607 thousand) are Russians, about 6% (62 thousand) are Ukrainians, 1.5% (15.5 thousand) are Tatars, and 1.4% (15 thousand) are Belarusians. Most of the population of the Republic of Komi resides in urban centres, a notable minority continues to live in villages. The Komi population in the countryside tends to be higher than that of Komi in urban areas, where ethnic Russians make up the majority of the population. Like the rest of the Finno-Ugric peoples of Russia, the population continues to steadily decrease - the 2010 census recorded only 228,235 people who indicated their nationality as "Komi", as compared to the 336,309 recorded as Komi in the 1989 census.

Language

The Komi language belongs to the Permian branch of the Uralic family. There is limited mutual intelligibility with Udmurt. There are two main dialects: Zyrian and Permyak, though Permyak is sometimes considered to be a separate language. Until the 18th century, Komi was written in the Old Permic alphabet (Komi: Важ Перым гижӧм, 𐍮𐍐‎𐍕 𐍟‎𐍔‎𐍠𐍨𐍜 𐍒‎𐍣‎𐍕𐍩𐍜‎, Važ Perym gužom), also known as Anbur in reference in reference to its first 2 letters, which was invented by Saint Stephen of Perm in the 14th century, seeing use up to the 16th century after which it saw use as a cryptographic writing system for Russian speakers. Cyrillic was used from the 19th century and briefly replaced by the Latin alphabet between 1929 and 1933. The Komi language is currently written in Cyrillic, adding two extra letters - Іі and Ӧӧ - to represent vowel sounds which do not exist in Russian. The first book to be printed in Komi (a vaccination manual) appeared in 1815.

History
Based on linguistic reconstruction, the prehistoric Permians are assumed to have split into two peoples during the first millennium BC: the Komis and the Udmurts. By the 16th-17th centuries, the Komis further divided into the Komi-Permyaks (who remained in the Kama River basin) and the Komi-Zyryans (who migrated north).

From the 12th century the Russians began to expand into the Perm region and the Komis came into contact with Novgorod. Novgorodian traders travelled to the region in search of furs and animal hides. The Novgorodians referred to the southern Komi region as "the Great Perm". Komi dukes unified the Great Perm with its centre at the stronghold of Cherdyn. As the Middle Ages progressed, Novgorod gave way to Moscow as the leading Russian power in the region. In 1365, Dmitry Donskoy, Prince of Moscow, gave Stephen of Perm the task of converting the region to Christianity. Stephen's mission led to the creation of the eparchy of Perm in 1383 and, after his death, Stephen became the patron saint of the Komis. He also devised an alphabet for the Komi language. Nevertheless, some Komis resisted Christianisation, notably the shaman Pama. The Duke of Perm accepted baptism only in 1470 (he was given the Christian name Mikhail), possibly in an attempt to stave off Russian military pressure in the region. Mikhail's conversion failed to stop an attack by Moscow which seized Cherdyn in 1472. Mikhail was allowed to keep his title of duke but was now a vassal of Moscow. The duchy survived only until 1505 when Mikhail's son Matvei was replaced by a Russian governor and Komi independence came to an end.

In the 1500s, many Russian migrants began to move into the region, beginning a long process of colonisation and attempts at assimilating the Komis. Syktyvkar (Ust-Sysolsk before 1930) was founded as the chief Russian city in the region in the 18th century. The Russian government established penal settlements in the north for criminals and political prisoners. There were several Komi rebellions in protest against Russian rule and the influx of Slav settlers, especially after large numbers of freed serfs arrived in the region from the 1860s. A national movement to revive Komi culture also emerged.

Russian rule in the area collapsed after World War I and the revolutions of 1917. In the subsequent Russian Civil War, the Bolsheviks fought the Allies for control of the region. The Allied interventionist forces encouraged the Komi to set up their own independent state with the help of political prisoners freed from the local penal colonies. After the Allies withdrew in 1919, the Bolsheviks took over. They promoted Komi culture with the policy of korenizatsiya, but increased industrialisation damaged the Komis' traditional way of life & the landscape of the republic. Stalin's purges of the 1930s devastated the Komi intelligentsia, who were accused of "bourgeois nationalism". The remote and inhospitable region was also regarded as an ideal location for the prison camps of the Gulag. The influx of political prisoners and the rapid industrialisation of the region as a result of World War II left the Komi a minority in their own lands. Stalin carried out further purges of the Komi intellectual class in the 1940s and 1950s, and Komi language and culture were suppressed. Since the end of the Soviet Union in 1991, the Komi have reasserted their claims to a separate identity.

Culture

Architecture 

The Komi settlements were set-up with large, multi-courtyard churchyards & villages, which were typically constructed along or close to a river. Since the Komi people inhabit territories densely covered with forests, the main material for the construction of houses and farm buildings has traditionally been wood. Komi dwellings in many respects resemble North Russian houses in their internal structure. 2 major types of house types exist among the Komi; the Sysol house type (Сисольський тип) & the Vym house type (Bимський тип). The Sysol home is in a square-shaped, divided internally between a commercial section & the private section for its residents. The Vym house type is not very easy to distinguish from the Sysol home, its major differences lying in the windows & internal arrangement. The Izhma Komi, living in sparsely-wooded areas live in chum tents.
The efforts of Stephen of Perm to convert the Komi people to Orthodoxy had allowed the Komi to begin constructing & experimenting with church architecture, creating many churches with the tented-roof style similarly to the constructions happening in Northern Russia & Pomerania. While most churches in the territory of the republic were constructed with wood, select churches & monasteries featured stone construction. The republic had over 430 churches in 1917, but this number has fallen down to just 130, 31 of which are registered under heritage programs.

Clothing 

The national dress of the Komi people is quite diverse and has numerous local variants. While men's clothing had remained mostly similar throughout the territories inhabited by the Komi people (excluding the winter costumes of Komi males), women's clothing has more variety, each region having its own distinct clothing type. These differences lie in the embroidery technique, type of fabrics and ornamentation. In general, the traditional clothing of the southern and central Komi closely resembles that of the Northern Russians & other Finno-Ugric groups, while the costume of the Izhma Komi has many common features with the Nenets.

Cuisine 

Hunting, gathering and fishing have long been the main source of food for the Komi people, displayed through the dominance of meat, fish, berries & mushrooms in most Komi diets. Meat dishes were more common in the diet of the northern Komi, while dishes utilizing berries were more common in the south. Popular dishes of Komi cuisine are grain pies with fish, various porridges, Serbanka, other sour soups, cold soups based on bread, kvass, etc. The popular Russian dumpling dish pelmeni likely has its origins in the cuisine of the Komi & Udmurt (Permian) peoples, its name ( пельнянь, pel'n'an''') meaning "ear bread" in both languages.

 Folklore and religion 
Most Komi myths are related to shamanism and paganism. The most widespread myths are about the creation of the world as a result of the struggle of two gods, En (Komi: Ен) and Omyol (Komi: <span lang="kv" dir="ltr">Омöль, Omöl'</span>). These 2 deities are regarded as creator-gods in the Komi mythos, who created all life in the world (though it was En who would vivify them). As the Komi were gradually Christianized, the depictions of En & Omyol began to mirror those of God & Satan, in which Omyol would be depicted as the latter due to his efforts to hamper En's creation process. Even with the Christianization of the Komi, there are relatively few Christian legends and tales in the folklore of the Komi, but tales of chudins, who are pagans and flee away from the new order to the forests, have become widespread. Some notable characters from Komi mythology include Jirmak (Йиркап) from Sindor, who is thought by the Komi to have invented skis, Joma (Ёма) who is regarded to be a Komi equivalent to the Baba Yaga & Pera (Пера) who is a character from the tales of the Komi-Permyaks known for his courage.

Information regarding the pre-Christian Komi religion is not well researched, with formal research by Russian ethnologists only beginning during the later half of the 19th century. According to The Life of Saint Stefan, the Bishop of Perm'' (1897) by Epiphany the Wise, the Komi ancestors had many deities, whose wooden images stood in dedicated cult sanctuaries for higher-ranking deities, while those of domestic deities were kept in Komi dwellings.

Genetics 
A study on north-eastern-European populations, published in March 2013, found that Komi-Zyryans form a distinct pole of genetic diversity.

See also 
Sami people
Nenets people
Indigenous peoples

References

Sources

Further reading

External links

English
 Komi-Izhemtsy against World Bank
 Komi
 Komi Permyak
Finno-Ugric media centre

Russian
 http://uralistica.com/group/komipermians
 Komi Permyak (in language Komi-Permyak)
 Komi Permyak

 
Permians
Nomadic groups in Eurasia
Indigenous peoples of Europe
Ethnic groups in Russia
Modern nomads
History of Ural